The Baptist Church of Hungary is a Baptist Christian denomination in Hungary. It is affiliated with the Baptist World Alliance. The headquarters is in Budapest.

History
The Baptist Church of Hungary has its origins in the first Baptist church in Budapest founded by the German missionary Heinrich Meyer of the British and Foreign Bible Society in 1874.  In 1900, the Baptist Union of Hungary was founded.  In 1920, a group of churches broke away from the Baptist Union of Hungary to form the Baptist Church of Hungary.  According to a denomination census released in 2020, it claimed 299 churches and 11,406 members.

References

External links
 Official Website

Baptist denominations in Europe
Evangelicalism in Hungary